Micromus angulatus is a species of brown lacewing in the family Hemerobiidae. It is found in Africa, Europe and Northern Asia (excluding China), North America, and Southern Asia.

References

Further reading

 

Hemerobiiformia
Insects described in 1836